John Forest (1471–1538) was a martyr.

John Forest may also refer to:

John Forest (priest), Dean of Wells, 1425–1446
John Anthony Forest (1838–1911), Bishop of San Antonio

See also
John Forrest (disambiguation)
John de Forest (1907–1997), English amateur golfer